Evelyn Maersk is owned and operated by the AP Moller-Maersk Group out of Copenhagen, Denmark.

Hull and engine
The keel was laid in March 2007 at Odense Steel Shipyard. The ship can move up to 11,000 containers at one time.

Evelyn Maersk only requires a 13-man crew.

Emissions
Evelyn Maersk uses one of the most efficient power plants, using its exhaust heat for boilers and purifying its fuel. Even though the power plants are efficient, Evelyn Mearsk and her sisters have come under scrutiny for burning heavy fuel oil, a black oil that gives off high amounts of sulfur and other pollutants. Although by Ton transporting freight by cargo ship is the least pollutant option, Evelyn Maersk gives off ten tons of nitrogen oxide per day of running.

45,000 tonnes of toys
In Autumn of 2010 Evelyn Maersk restocked Britain and Europe's toy stores with the years best selling toy (Jet Pack Buzz Lightyear). The ship docked in Felixstowe, Suffolk, with a million toys, boardgames, and puzzles brought over from China.

Saved 352 immigrants off Sicily
In August 2014 the container vessel participated into the search and rescue operation for sinking fishing boat with 352 immigrants in Mediterranean Sea off Sicily. After more than 10 hours of searching Evelyn Maersk found the disabled and sinking fishing boat with list of 30 degrees. On board there were 352 immigrants (including 41 children in bad condition) from Syria and the Horn of Africa region. All of them were transported by Evelyn Maersk to Sicily, where they were hospitalized.

References

External links
 Maersk Fleet
 Maersk Line
 Evelyn Maersk rescued 352 immigrants off Sicily

Container ships
Merchant ships of Denmark
Ships of the Maersk Line
2007 ships
Ships built in Odense